The 2020–21 Vijay Hazare Trophy was the 19th season of the Vijay Hazare Trophy, a List A cricket tournament in India. It was contested by 38 teams, divided into six groups, with six teams in Group E. Bengal, Chandigarh, Haryana, Jammu and Kashmir, Saurashtra and Services were placed in Group E, with all the matches taking place in Kolkata. Saurashtra won Group E to qualify for the knockout stage of the tournament.

Points table

Fixtures

Round 1

Round 2

Round 3

Round 4

Round 5

References

Vijay Hazare Trophy
Vijay Hazare Trophy